Hanö Bay is a sandy bay, stretching from Listerlandet in the north to Stenshuvud in the south, on the east coast of Skåne, South Sweden. It is named after Hanö island.

External links

Bays of Sweden
Landforms of Blekinge County
Landforms of Skåne County